Ivica Francišković (born 28 September 1978) is a Serbian former professional footballer of Vojvodinian Croat descent who played as a midfielder. He was capped for FR Yugoslavia at under-21 level.

Francišković started out at his hometown club Spartak Subotica. He spent most of his career with Vojvodina, making 113 league appearances and scoring 12 goals between 2000 and 2005. In the latter stages of his career, Francišković also played in Hungary, Cyprus, and Montenegro.

Statistics

Honours
Rudar Pljevlja
 Montenegrin Cup: 2010–11

References

External links
 HLSZ profile
 
 

AEK Larnaca FC players
Association football midfielders
Cypriot First Division players
Expatriate footballers in Cyprus
Expatriate footballers in Hungary
Expatriate footballers in Montenegro
First League of Serbia and Montenegro players
FK Partizan players
FK Rudar Pljevlja players
FK Spartak Subotica players
FK Vojvodina players
Montenegrin First League players
Nemzeti Bajnokság I players
OFK Grbalj players
Serbia and Montenegro under-21 international footballers
Serbia and Montenegro footballers
Serbian expatriate footballers
Serbian expatriate sportspeople in Cyprus
Serbian expatriate sportspeople in Hungary
Serbian expatriate sportspeople in Montenegro
Serbian footballers
Sportspeople from Subotica
Zalaegerszegi TE players
1978 births
Living people
Croats of Vojvodina